The Cathedral of Mary Our Queen is a Catholic cathedral located in northern Baltimore, Maryland. The structure, remarkable in size, was completed in 1959.

The cathedral is the seat of the Archbishop of Baltimore, joining the Basilica of the National Shrine of the Assumption of the Blessed Virgin Mary, on Cathedral Street at Mulberry Street, in downtown Baltimore. Because the archdiocese is the premier see of the United States and the downtown basilica was the nation's first Catholic cathedral, this second edifice now serves as co-cathedral.

Location 
The cathedral is located in the Homeland area of northern Baltimore near Loyola University Maryland and St. Mary's Seminary and University, the first Catholic seminary in the United States. It was constructed using funds bequeathed by an Irish Baltimore merchant, Thomas J O'Neill. It is said to be "the only cathedral in the 2,000 year history of the Church that was donated by a single individual."

History

Groundbreaking

In October 1954, ground was broken for the new cathedral. On the morning of October 13, 1959, a few days past the fifth anniversary of the groundbreaking, Bishop Jerome Sebastian consecrated the cathedral.

Building 
The design is modified Gothic with Art Deco accents, constructed of brick faced with limestone, and uses a classical east-facing cruciform floor plan. The Cathedral features and extensive sculptural program executed by Joseph Coletti.

Crypt
The crypt under the main floor of the cathedral is reserved for the remains of archbishops and auxiliary bishops of Baltimore. The list of bishops buried in the crypt:

Bishop Jerome Aloysius Daugherty Sebastian, d. 1960
Archbishop Francis Patrick Keough, d. 1961
Cardinal Lawrence Shehan, d. 1984
Bishop Thomas Austin Murphy, d. 1991
Bishop Philip Francis Murphy, d. 1999
Archbishop William Donald Borders, d. 2010
Bishop William Clifford Newman, d. 2017

Additional
A cellphone antenna is concealed within one tower, generating revenue for the congregation and diocese.

Pope John Paul II visited both the Cathedral of Mary Our Queen and the Basilica, as Pope in 1995 and in 1976 as Cardinal Karol Wojtyla. A plaque outside the Blessed Sacrament Chapel in the north transept commemorates the 1995 visit.

Organs

The cathedral has two organs. The original organs were Opus 9200 of the M. P. Moller Company of Hagerstown, Maryland. After 46 years of use and some considerable damage due to water and smoke the congregation decided to restore the cathedral organs in 2005. It chose Schantz Organ Co. of Ohio to restore and replace many parts of the original instruments. The restoration began with the removal of the Great Gallery organ and, after it was reinstalled and operable, work began on the chancel organ.

In addition to new pipe work, voice work, new wind chests, Schantz built two new identical four-manual consoles—one for the gallery and one for the chancel—allowing the organist to control both organs from either location. The chancel console can be moved around the sanctuary to suit various needs. In the original Moller installation, the Great Gallery organ console had four-manuals and could control over both the gallery and sanctuary organs. The sanctuary organ console was two manuals, had complete control over the sanctuary organ and the gallery organ through "blind" controls. The sanctuary console was replaced in 1974 due to a fire in the console which caused smoke damage to both organs' pipework. After the renovations, the Great Gallery organ holds 100 ranks, and the sanctuary organ holds 27.

The first solo concert performance on the restored organ occurred July 5, 2007, by Cherry Rhodes as part of the closing ceremonies of the American Guild of Organists regional convention held in Baltimore.

See also

List of churches in the Roman Catholic Archdiocese of Baltimore
List of Catholic cathedrals in the United States
List of cathedrals in the United States

References

External links
Official Cathedral Site
Roman Catholic Archdiocese of Baltimore Official Site
Cathedral of Mary Our Queen – Explore Baltimore Heritage

Roman Catholic churches in Baltimore
Mary Our Queen, Cathedral of
Roman Catholic churches completed in 1959
Art Deco architecture in Maryland
Irish-American culture in Baltimore
Northern Baltimore
Cathedrals in Maryland
20th-century Roman Catholic church buildings in the United States